Oliver John "Sandy" Morgan (born 7 June 1945) is an Australian cricketer. He played in 37 first-class matches for Queensland between 1965 and 1970.

See also
 List of Queensland first-class cricketers

References

External links
 

1945 births
Living people
Australian cricketers
Queensland cricketers
Cricketers from Brisbane